Bjørn Håvard Wiik (born 13 February 1957 in Bruvik, Norway; died 26 February 1999 in Hamburg, Germany) was a Norwegian elementary particle physicist, noted for his role on the experiment that produced the first experimental evidence for gluons and for his influential role on later accelerator projects. Wiik was director of DESY, in Hamburg, Germany, from 1993 until his death.

Biography 
Bjørn Wiik lived in his home town Bruvik until he finished his physics studies at Germany's Technische Universität Darmstadt. In 1965, he got his doctorate degree there. Two years later he began working at the Stanford Linear Accelerator Center in Menlo Park, California. In 1972, Wiik returned to Germany, to the German Electron Synchrotron (DESY) in Hamburg where,  four years later, he was appointed lead scientist. 

In 1978, Wiik and his collaborators finished using DESY's newly commissioned PETRA electron–positron storage ring to look for hard-gluon bremsstrahlung events that would provide experimental support for the existence and role of gluons in mediating  strong interactions among quarks.  Wiik and his team  soon observed and reported a type of event never described before: three particle-jets whose momenta lay in a plane. These results, widely believed to represent the after-effects of two quarks plus a gluon, were soon confirmed by many other groups. In 1995, the European Physical Society awarded its Prize for High Energy and Particle Physics to four physicists representing the TASSO collaboration (Paul Söding, Bjørn Wiik, Günter Wolf, and Sau Lan Wu) for demonstrating the existence of the gluon.

Already during his stay at SLAC, Wiik had not a new type of particle accelerator, which would be based on colliding a beam of protons with a beam of electrons.  In 1980, this idea took concrete form with the creation at DESY of the hadron-electron ring facility HERA). Wiik was also responsible for proposing and overseeing the implementation of a superconducting linear accelerator for Tera-electronvolt energies, TESLA.

Wiik was chairman of the Super Proton Synchrotron Experiments Committee (SPSC) at CERN from 1979-80. 

He was elected a Fellow of the American Physical Society in 1989 "for his contributions to the realization of the large electron-proton colliding beam facility, HERA, at the Deutches Electron Synschotron Laboratory in Hamburg, West Germany"

References

External links 
 
 Nachruf Press release with biographical material
 A tribute to Bjørn Wiik from the CERN-COURIER
 Eclipse of a visionary from the CERN-COURIER

1937 births
1999 deaths
People from Vaksdal
Technische Universität Darmstadt alumni
Norwegian physicists
Accelerator physicists
People associated with CERN
Fellows of the American Physical Society